Sydney Seymour Simpson (November 18, 1856 – 1939) was an English-born farmer and political figure in Saskatchewan. He represented Battleford in the Legislative Assembly of Saskatchewan from 1908 to 1917 as a Liberal.

He was born in Ledsham, West Yorkshire, the son of Michael H. Simpson. In 1883, he travelled west in Canada, settling in Battleford, Saskatchewan. Simpson married Margaret Ann Speers.

References 

Saskatchewan Liberal Party MLAs
1856 births
1939 deaths